The Bay of Puck or Puck Bay, is a shallow western branch of the Bay of Gdańsk in the southern Baltic Sea, off the shores of Gdańsk Pomerania, Poland. It is separated from the open sea by the Hel Peninsula.

There is a shallow sand-bank from Rewa to Kuźnica in the middle of Hel Peninsula. The bay is available only for small fishing boats and yachts, which have to stick to the strict deeper routes. There are deposits of potassium salt below the Bay of Puck. The main ports are Puck, Jastarnia, and Hel.

Geography

Rivers
Gizdepka
Płutnica

See also

Special Protection Areas in Poland

References

Puck
Puck
Natura 2000 in Poland